Ben Cartwright (born 17 June 1976) is a British actor who has made guest appearances on some of Britain's most popular television shows.

He appeared in Judge John Deed in 2001, playing Paul Bailey. He also had a small part in EastEnders in 2003, playing Tony Jamison.

He played Heath Gambol in Casualty in 2005. His fifth and most recent role in Casualty was as Felix Barstow, in July 2018.

In 2009, he appeared in the film version of Sherlock Holmes as a graveside policeman, and also played the role of a policeman in another 2009 release, The Imaginarium of Dr Parnassus.

Cartwright also had a role in the television series Hatfields & McCoys, which was aired on The History Channel in the USA on 28 May 2012. Cartwright plays Parris McCoy alongside Kevin Costner and Bill Paxton. The series has had the biggest ratings of any television show, second to the Super Bowl.

In 2013, he starred in the British movie Run for Your Wife, which grossed just £602 at the UK box office, in its opening weekend.

He made an appearance as Steve Kettle in Tracy Beaker Returns and The Dumping Ground. He also portrayed DS Chris Henney in By Any Means.

He has starred in the CBBC programme Eve as Nick Clarke.

He also starred in Coronation Street as Neil Clifton, a police officer involved in the sexual exploitation and sexual grooming of Bethany Platt.

Cartwright was cast in the first series of ITV Drama Fearless in 2017. He played Phil Simms in the series and was hiding crucial information about his niece's disappearance.

In 2019, he plays Rasputin in the Netflix 6 episode docu-drama The Last Czars.

Filmography

Film

Television

References

External links

British male television actors
Living people
1979 births
21st-century British male actors
British male soap opera actors